Gabriels Creek is a  long 2nd order tributary to the Deep River in Randolph County, North Carolina.  Gabriels Creek is the only stream in the United States by this name in the plural.  There are two other streams by the name of Gabriel Creek (no s).

Course
Gabriels Creek rises in a pond about 0.5 miles east of Asheboro in Randolph County, North Carolina and then flows northeast to join the Deep River about 0.5 miles west of Cedar Falls, North Carolina.

Watershed
Gabriels Creek drains  of area, receives about 46.9 in/year of precipitation, and has a wetness index of 374.54 and is about 60% forested.

References

Rivers of North Carolina
Rivers of Randolph County, North Carolina